Moussa Coulibaly is a Malian football defender who currently plays for Iranian football club Foolad in the Persian Gulf Pro League.

Club career

Stade Malien
Moussa Coulibaly joined the senior team in 2009. He played in 2011 CAF Champions League.

Djoliba
Moussa Coulibaly transferred to Djoliba in 2012. He played in 2013 CAF Champions League, scoring against Casa Sports. Moussa Coulibaly also played in the full season and scored two goals against CS Duguwolofila.

Esteghlal Khuzestan
Coulibaly joined Esteghlal Khuzestan in summer 2013 after being spotted by head coach Abdollah Veisi. He became a regular in the 2014–15 season, starting 23 games and scoring a goal. In the 2015–16 season he became one of Esteghlal Khuzestan's key players and was recognized as one of the best defenders in the league. In that season he helped the club to a historic first Persian Gulf Pro League championship. Due to his good performances throughout the season, Coulibaly was named in the Persian Gulf Pro League 2015–16 team of the season.

Sepahan
In May 2016 after his coach at Esteghlal Khuzestan, Abdollah Veisi, became coach of Sepahan, Coulibaly signed a two-year contract with the club. Coulibaly scored his first goal with Sepahan on 27 October 2016 in a 1–1 draw against Saipa. One month later on 24 November, he scored again in a 1–1 draw against Foolad.

Esteghlal Khuzestan 
In May 2017 he returned to his previous club for a two-year contract.

International career
Moussa Coulibaly played for Mali Under-20 at 2 competitions. He started his debut for Mali under-20 in 2011 FIFA U-20 World Cup against Colombia Under-20, the game ended as a 2-0 defeat for Mali. Moussa Coulibaly also played in 2011 African Youth Championship, Coulibaly played 4 games in that competition and Mali finished fourth.

Club career statistics

Honours
Stade Malien
Malian Première Division: 2011–12 (Runners Up)
 CAF Confederation Cup: 2012 (Runners Up)

Esteghlal Khuzestan
Persian Gulf Pro League: 2015–16

Foolad
Hazfi Cup: 2020–21
Iranian Super Cup: 2021

Individual
Persian Gulf Pro League Team of the Year: 2015–16

References

External links

 Moussa Coulibaly at IranLeague.ir
 
 
 Moussa Coulibaly at PersianLeague.com 

1993 births
Living people
Malian footballers
Esteghlal Khuzestan players
Sepahan S.C. footballers
Naft Masjed Soleyman F.C. players
Foolad FC players
Persian Gulf Pro League players
Expatriate footballers in Iran
Malian expatriate footballers
Sportspeople from Bamako
Association football defenders
21st-century Malian people
Mali A' international footballers
2011 African Nations Championship players
Malian expatriate sportspeople in Iran
Stade Malien players